This is a character list for the 37th Super Sentai series Zyuden Sentai Kyoryuger and the Korean-exclusive sequel series Zyuden Sentai Kyoryuger Brave. Aside from dinosaur themes, the series also incorporates Japanese and English word play related to the characters and terminologies.

Main characters

Kyoryugers

Having witnessed a race of prehistoric people that lived alongside the dinosaurs, Torin created the Kyoryugers with one fundamental in mind: music as means to guide the Zyudenryu alongside humans able to move to the rhythm. The Tiger Boy family restaurant also serves as the team's civilian hangout.

Each Kyoryuger use their partner Zyudenryu's Zyudenchi to transform and additional Zyudenchi to perform a multitude of attacks.

During the events of the film Zyuden Sentai Kyoryuger vs. Go-Busters: The Great Dinosaur Battle!

Daigo Kiryu
, who encourages others to call him , is a wild, gallant, and charismatic man who possesses the unique quality to charm anyone into becoming his friend and treasures his relationships above all else. A decade prior to the series, he traveled the world with his father, Dantetsu, before the latter left to fight the Deboth Army. Though he was given the option to return to Japan, Daigo sought to instead follow in his father's footsteps and continue traveling the world. When his journey brought him into a battle against a group of Zorima, Daigo received his Gaburivolver from Torin and battled Gabutyra for a month to tame him.

As Kyoryu Red, Daigo wields the  gauntlet. Over the course of the series, Daigo gains additional weapons such as the  gauntlet through the  Zyudenchi during the DVD special Zyuden Sentai Kyoryuger: It's Here! Armed On Midsummer Festival!! and a secondary Gabutyra Fang through the  Zyudenchi during the film Zyuden Sentai Kyoryuger: Gaburincho of Music.

When Gabutyra becomes Minityra and assumes  mode, Kyoryu Red can transform into  and gain additional power. The Gabutyra de Carnival can also combine with the Gaburivolver to create the  cannon. Through the process of Snapping Changes, Kyoryu Red Carnival can borrow his allies' Zyudenchi and channel the power of the Kyoryugers' mecha, Kyoryuzin, via the following forms:
: A form accessed from the Stegotchi and Dricera Zyudenchis that arms him with the Stegotchi Shield and Dricera Drill.
: A unique form accessed from the Stegotchi and Tobaspino Zyudenchis that arms him with the Stegotchi Shield and Spino Boomerang.
: A form accessed from the Parasagun and Zakutor Zyudenchis that arms him with the Parasa Beam Gun and Zakutor Sword.
: A form accessed from the Ankydon and Dricera Zyudenchis that arms him with the Ankydon Hammer and Dricera Drill.
: A form accessed from the Ankydon and Bunpachy Zyudenchis that arms him with the Ankydon Hammer and Bunpachy Ball.

Ian Yorkland
 is a cheerful casanova and former archaeologist whose bright personality and dry wit hides a tragic past. During the Deboth Army's initial attack, he lost his best friend and fellow treasure hunter, Shiro Mifune, to Aigallon. He originally distances himself from the other Kyoryugers until Daigo helps him overcome the trauma he suffered from Shiro's death and become friends with his teammates. As the Kyoryugers' smartest member, Yorkland is a diligent and skilled tactician who helps lead the team whenever Daigo is unavailable.

As Kyoryu Black, Yorkland wields the  beam gun.

Nobuharu Udo
Previously a salaryman, he moved in with his sister, Yuko Fukui, and his niece, Rika, after the untimely death of Yuko's husband Kenichi, and took over operations for Kenichi's shop, . Due to his being the oldest member of the team and penchant for using oyaji gags, outdated and unfunny puns which his late brother-in-law enjoyed, Canderrilla finds amusing, and others find annoying, Udo's peers have taken to calling him , much to his dismay. Originally, he is reluctant to fight as he worries about his family getting caught in the crossfire. However, Daigo convinces Udo that his family is a source of strength and motivation rather than a weakness.

Souji Rippukan
Despite his formidable skill as a swordsman and respect for his father Genryu's hope that he will carry on the family legacy, Souji is unsure of what he wants to do with his life and resents his father for neglecting his mother. Initially distant from the other Kyoryugers, Souji eventually joins the team when Daigo helps resolve his issues with Genryu.

During the events of the V-Cinema Zyuden Sentai Kyoryuger Returns: Hundred Years After, Souji lives to become 116 by the year 2114 due to life-expectancy improving in the intervening years and become his great-grandson, Soujirou's, mentor before helping him and his friends Icchan and Uppie become part of the new Kyoryugers.

As Kyoryu Green, Souji wields the  claw. He later inherits Torin's Feather Edge near the series finale and would later pass on the sword to Soujirou in the future.

Amy Yuuzuki
Though she has a personal butler named Gentle who attends to her needs, Yuuzuki works as a part-time waitress at the Tiger Boy family restaurant and makes no effort to hide her personality even in spite of Gentle's efforts to help her behave like an elegant lady until he eventually comes to understand her true nature. After being captured by the Deboth Army, Souji learns Amy acquired the ability to use her feet like a second pair of hands, a skill ironically obtained due to laziness instead of hard work. When the Ulshades join the team, Yuuzuki struggles with the possibility that she has feelings for Daigo until she discovers he reciprocates during their final battle with Deboth himself.

As Kyoryu Pink, Amy wields the  drill.

Utsusemimaru
He previously served under and fought alongside Lord Iwaizumi Mōshinosuke against the Deboth Army until Deboth Army members Chaos and Dogold formulated a scheme to enrage Utsusemimaru and gain control of Pteragordon. Once the samurai had fallen into their trap, he was sealed within Dogold's body for centuries. While Utsusemimaru was presumed dead, the modern day Kyoryugers eventually discover what happened and free him from Dogold. Despite this, he initially puts on an air of arrogance and distances himself from them as his late lord believed kindness was a sign of weakness. After Yuuzuki and Daigo discover his humble and considerate personality, Utsusemimaru drops the facade and joins the Kyoryugers. Amidst their battles with the Deboth Army, the samurai develops a rivalry with Dogold until the latter falls under Endolf's control. Utsusemimaru eventually frees his rival and joins him in destroying Endolf before giving Dogold an honorable death. The samurai also falls in the battle, but he is revived by the power of the True Melody of the Earth. Following Deboth's destruction, Utsusemimaru adopts the  surname for himself out of respect for his deceased Lord.

As Kyoryu Gold, Utsusemimaru uses the  gauntlet to transform and wields the  sword. During the events of the DVD Special Zyuden Sentai Kyoryuger: It's Here! Armed On Midsummer Festival!!, he temporarily acquires the  via the  Zyudenchi.

Zyudenryu
The  are sentient dinosaurs given power by Torin to fight the Deboth Army during their first invasion. After defeating them the first time, the Zyudenryu entered hibernation in various parts of the world until they are reawakened in the modern day when the Deboth Army returns and gain Kyoryuger partners. When a Zyudenchi is used, the Kyoryu Spirit within it allows the Zyudenryu to assume a more powerful , which increases their combat capability and grants them the ability to combine with other Zyudenryu via  to battle enlarged Debo Monsters.
 : A red Tyrannosaurus and Kyoryu Red's partner that normally resides in a volcanic island in the south seas until he is summoned. When Gabutyra enters his battle mode, his crest raises and he can harness the power of other Zyudenchi. Despite becoming Daigo's partner, Gabutyra is initially reluctant to place him in harm's way before Daigo convinces the Zyudenryu to let him fight by his side. With the Carnival Zyudenchi, Gabutyra can shrink down to a palm-sized  nicknamed . During the events of the film Zyuden Sentai Kyoryuger vs. Go-Busters: The Great Dinosaur Battle! Farewell Our Eternal Friends, Gabutyra's past self uses the power of Dino Hope to communicate with his future partner so they can stop Voldos. In the film Heisei Riders vs. Shōwa Riders: Kamen Rider Taisen feat.
 : A black Parasaurolophus and Kyoryu Black's partner that normally resides in an old European castle until it is summoned. When Parasagun enters its Battle Mode, its tail becomes a rifle. When combined with Zakutor, they grant a "Western" combination.
 : A blue Stegosaurus and Kyoryu Blue's partner that normally resides in the North Pole until it is summoned. When Stegotchi enters its Battle Mode, a blade grows from its back.
 : A green Velociraptor that normally resides in a bamboo thicket in Japan's mountains until it is summoned. When Zakutor enters its Battle Mode, its tail becomes a large claw. When combined with Parasagun, they grant a "Western" combination.
 : A pink Triceratops and Kyoryu Pink's partner that normally resides near the Grand Canyon in the United States until it is summoned. When Dricera enters its Battle Mode, its tail becomes a drill. When combined with Ankydon, they grant a "Macho" combination.
 : A golden Pteranodon and Kyoryu Gold's partner that normally resides in dark clouds until it is summoned. Pteragordon became Utsusemimaru's partner during the Sengoku period, but sustained damage after its partner fell under Dogold's control. While healing in Gabutyra's volcano, Chaos releases it to serve the Deboth Army until Utsusemimaru is freed from Dogold and allows Pteragordon fight by its fellow Zyudenryu's side once more. When Pteragordon enters its Battle Mode, it can emit lightning bolts.
 : A cyan Ankylosaurus and Kyoryu Cyan's partner that normally resides underground until it is summoned. Originally forming a pact with Ramirez in the Middle Ages, Ankydon battled Debo Viruson before it was possessed by the Zetsumate. In the present, Yuuzuki eventually tricks Debo Viruson out of the Zyudenryu. When Ankydon enters its Battle Mode, its tail becomes a hammer. When combined with Dricera or Bunpachy, they grant a "Macho" or "Kung-Fu" combination respectively.
Bunpachy became Tessai's partner fifteen centuries prior and spent the intervening years in spiritual meditation until the modern day Kyoryugers require its aid. When Bunpachy enters its Battle Mode, its forehead separates and turns the Zyudenryu's tail into a morning star. When combined with Ankydon, they grant a "Kung-Fu" combination.
 : A violet Plesiosaurus and Kyoryu Violet's partner that normally resides in the Plezuon Lab's dock until it is summoned. Originally a purely aquatic Zyudenryu, Doctor Ulshade granted Plezuon the ability to travel through space.
 : A silver Brachiosaurus, Kyoryu Silver's partner, as well as the largest and most powerful Zyudenryu who fought alongside Torin during the original fight with Deboth. After using the unstable  to defeat Deboth, Bragigas was dragged underground and drastically weakened until the Kyoryugers find the Lost Stones and revive it. Following this, Bragigas reabsorbs the Spirit Base and resides near the Earth's core until it is needed. Unlike most of the other Zyudenryu, Bragigas can use the Guardians' Zyudenchi alongside its own to access their powers while in Battle Mode.
 : A navy blue Spinosaurus and the first Zyudenryu to manifest in the ancient battle against the Deboth Army. While Tobaspino fell under D's enchantment and was forced to attack its allies, an ancient priestess' singing gave the Zyudenryu the will to resist D's control and defeat him. Following this, Tobaspino entered a deep sleep until the events of the film Zyuden Sentai Kyoryuger: Gaburincho of Music, when D awakens it after putting the priestess' descendant Mikoto Amano under his spell. Tobaspino almost destroys the world before the Kyoryugers purify the Zyudenryu. Ever since, Tobaspino became a permanent ally of theirs. When Tobaspino enters its Battle Mode, a boomerang emerges from its sail.
 : Lesser Zyudenryu who took part in the original fight against the Deboth Army. Despite being killed in battle, Bragigas's tears fossilized the Guardians into the Lost Stones, which were scattered across the Earth until the Kyoryugers recover and use them to revive Bragigas. The Guardians' Zyudenchi are primarily used by the Kyoryugers and the Zyudenryu for various attacks, though Bragigas can use all their abilities at once.

Zyuden Giants
The  are robots combined/transformed from the Zyudenryu, which the Kyoryugers pilot through motion capture, capable of executing their own self-titled . In battle, a Zyuden Giant can also arm/exchange their limbs with another Zyudenryu for additional strength.

: The Kyoryugers' primary mecha and the combination of Gabutyra, Stegotchi, and Dricera.
: The combination of Gabutyra, Parasagun, and Zakutor that grants proficiency in both long-range and close combat.
: The combination of Gabutyra, Ankydon, and Dricera that grants superhuman strength.
: The combination of Gabutyra, Ankydon, and Bunpachy that grants proficiency in martial arts.
: A variation of Raiden Kyoryuzin armed with the Go-Busters' mecha Tategami LiOh's . This formation appears exclusively in the film Zyuden Sentai Kyoryuger vs. Go-Busters: The Great Dinosaur Battle! Farewell Our Eternal Friends.
: A  consisting of Kyoryuzin and Kamen Rider Wizard's WizarDragon capable of harnessing the power of past Tyrannosaurus-themed Sentai mecha. This formation appears exclusively in the crossover film Kamen Rider × Super Sentai × Space Sheriff: Super Hero Taisen Z.
: The combination of Gabutyra, Bunpachy, and Plezuon that possesses the ability to paralyze Deboth cells via the  attack.
: A unique formation wherein Kyoryuzin is armed with a giant baseball bat, with which it can perform the  attack.
: The combination of Kyoryuzin, Parasagun, Zakutor, and Bragigas armed with the  staff. With the help of Yayoi, Bragigas' Gigant Cannon is modified into a safer variant called the  so the mecha can perform the  finisher.
: Pteragordon's mecha form achieved via  that is armed with the  blades and the  cannon. Under Dogold's influence, the brainwashed Zyuden Giant gains a bulletproof cape on its back.
: The combination of Pteragordon, Parasagun, and Zakutor.
While strong and sluggish in terrestrial environments, PlezuOh becomes fast and agile in space through the use of its boosters.
D originally forced this combination into being to execute the  attack until the Kyoryugers free Tobaspino from his influence.
: The combination of Tobaspino, Parasagun, and Zakutor.

Kyoryuger Brave
The  are the protagonists of the Korean-exclusive sequel series Zyuden Sentai Kyoryuger Brave. Composed of South Korean residents, Torin assembles the team in the wake of the Neo-Deboth Army's attack. They also possess a  sword as a sidearm.

Kwon Juyong
 is the  who trained himself in the mountains from a young age and searches for his long lost older brother. During the Neo-Deboth Army's attack, Torin gives him the ability to transform into  after seeing the original Kyoryu Red, Daigo Kiryu, in him. Kwon is a bright and reliable leader who smiles when facing challenges. He is later revealed to be the true successor of the Power of the 'Saur King.

Jeon Hyeonjun
 is a police officer with superhuman strength who gains the ability to become . Despite his adherence for rules, he is quite friendly to others.

Jeon Hyeonjun is portrayed by Hong Sung-ho and voiced by Yamato Kinjo in the Japanese dub.

Kim Sechang
 is a member of the idol group  who gains the ability to become . A befitting idol, he retains his elegance while fighting.

Lee Pureun
 is a millionaire noble who gains the ability to become . While he is a spoiled individual, he demonstrates tremendous skill in gunfights.

Yun Dohee
 is an aspiring nurse who gains the ability to become . She is excellent in fast attacks.

Juhyeok
After being hired by the Neo-Deboth Army, he pretends to be the successor of the Power of the 'Saur King until Juyong's power is awakened. After his contract with the Neo-Deboth Army is nullified, Juhyeok joins forces with the Kyoryuger Brave so he can continue serving as Juyong's decoy.

Zyudenryu
 : Brave Kyoryu Red's Tyrannosaurus Zyudenryu, based on Kyoryu Red's Gabutyra, which possess a forehead-mounted Gatling gun.
 : Brave Kyoryu Black's Stegosaurus Zyudenryu, based on Kyoryu Blue's Stegotchi. When entering Battle Mode, it produces a large chainsaw from its back, which becomes a sword for Brave Kyoryuzin to wield.
 : Brave Kyoryu Blue's Triceratops Zyudenryu, based on Kyoryu Pink's Dricera. When entering Battle Mode, its front horns become a large shovel.
 : Brave Kyoryu Green's Parasaurolophus Zyudenryu, based on Kyoryu Black's Parasagun. When entering Battle Mode, its tail becomes a rifle. Unlike Parasagun, Parasaser is also armed with a mouth cannon.
 : Brave Kyoryu Pink's Velociraptor Zyudenryu, based on Kyoryu Green's Zakutor. When entering Battle Mode, its tail becomes a labrys.
 : Brave Kyoryu Gold's Pteranodon Zyudenryu, based on Kyoryu Gold's Pteragordon. Like its predecessor, it also possesses the ability to transform into its own robot mode, and combine with Brave Kyoryuzin to form .
 : A silver and purple Brachiosaurus Zyudenryu, based on Kyoryu Silver's Bragigas. Like its predecessor, it houses the Spirit Base, which also doubles as Canderrilla and Luckyulo's living space, possesses the ability to transform into its own robot mode, and combine with Brave Kyoryuzin, Parasaser, and Rapx to form . It is sealed by Jinarik during the Neo-Deboth Army's arrival, but Torin manages to remove the Spirit Base at the last minute to save Canderrilla and Luckyulo. The Kyoryuger Brave and Torin are later able to free Gigabragigas from Jinarik's control.

Other Zyudenchi
In a similar manner to the Guardians, the Kyoryuger Brave also utilize Zyudenchi that provide them additional attacks.
: The Zyudenchi of a Supersaurus Zyudenryu that grants superhuman speed.
: The Zyudenchi of a Pliosaurus Zyudenryu that grants the ability to turn invisible.
: The Zyudenchi of a Nyctosaurus Zyudenryu that grants the ability to fly.
: The Zyudenchi of a Dracorex Zyudenryu that grants the ability to turn into living metal.
: The Zyudenchi of an Irritator Zyudenryu that induces a spicy sensation in opponents.
: The Zyudenchi of a Thecodontosaurus Zyudenryu that grants the ability to perform continuous taekwondo feats.

Recurring characters

Deboth Army
The  are The Wonderful Wizard of Oz-themed alien beings formed from the cells of their group's namesake to aid him in invading Earth during the Mesozoic era by exterminating the planet's dominant lifeform, the dinosaurs. While they were defeated and sealed in ice by the Zyudenryu after centuries of battle, the Deboth Army slowly resurfaced over the following millennia to harvest humans' emotional energy to thaw Deboth and increase his knowledge on them so he can herald a new mass extinction. However, the Deboth Army is ultimately defeated by the Kyoryugers.

Deboth
To this end, Deboth traveled to numerous planets to study their dominant lifeforms, evolve into a form reflecting the targeted species, and leave the planet to unleash a melody that reduces it to a lifeless world. By the present, Deboth is partially thawed, but remains inactive as he now requires emotional energy from humans to adapt and destroy them. Eventually, Chaos grows impatient and subjects his master to a large amount of Restoration Water to forcibly resurrect Deboth, who goes on a rampage before Chaos calms him down.

While the Kyoryugers discover their enemy is afraid of their Brave and seemingly destroy him, Deboth survives by transferring his heart to Chaos before his body is destroyed and reverts to the Frozen Castle. After gaining the emotional energy he requires, Deboth fully resurrects and briefly possesses Chaos until he can transfer his heart back to his original body and evolve into the anthropomorphic Wizard of Oz-themed . Using his newly acquired knowledge on humanity and dark melody to negate the Kyoryugers' transformation capabilities, he attempts to achieve his goal of planetary genocide until Daigo Kiryu confronts and destroys him using the power of Earth's melody while the Zyudenryu destroy the Frozen Castle.

While he is frozen, his stirring grants his creations increased power. In his anthropomorphic form, he is armed with the  staff, is much faster and stronger than in his previous form, can perform the  attack, and enlarge on his own by removing his  shawl.

Chaos
 is the multi-faced Statue of Liberty-themed acting leader of the Deboth Army until Deboth's resurrection and one of his oldest creations who has overseen the destruction of several planets alongside his younger brother Torin. After Torin's betrayal however, Chaos vowed revenge, purposefully keeping an injury he sustained during their previous encounter as a reminder. Chaos resurfaced during Japan's Sengoku era to mastermind Utsusemimaru's capture and take control of the Zyudenryu Pteragordon before thawing out his followers in the present to revive Deboth and exterminate humanity just as they did with the dinosaurs. Even in spite of losing Pteragordon, Chaos begins preparing for Deboth's revival before Plezuon returns to Earth. While he seemingly perishes alongside Deboth while battling Bakuretsu Kyoryuzin, Chaos becomes his master's emotional conduit and temporarily goes into hiding before returning weeks later to create Endolf, Icelond, and Killborero to accelerate Deboth's revival. Amidst his master's endgame, Chaos leads his fellow Deboth Knights into battle against the Kyoryugers before allowing himself to be destroyed so he can protect the pillar holding Deboth Hell in place. However, they are both destroyed by the Spirit Rangers, Torin's spirit, and Canderrilla.

In battle, Chaos can generate  orbs and carries the  book.

Dogold
 is a foul-tempered club/Cowardly Lion/Oni/banchō-themed Deboth Knight, Chaos's second-in-command, and a living suit of armor capable of controlling anyone with a rage-filled mindset. As such, he is charged with amassing anger for Deboth. While aiding Chaos during Japan's Sengoku period, Dogold formed around Utsusemimaru's body to gain control of Pteragordon. Following his revival in the present day, he influences the amnesiac samurai to instill rage in humans until the Kyoryugers discover what happened and free their comrade while Dogold is forced to use Cambrimas as hosts. Following a failed attempt to take the android  as his host, Dogold undermines Endolf and uses him instead due to their similar primary emotions; gaining an increase in power in the process. As he was ordered not to kill his fellow knight, Dogold attempts to keep this secret from Chaos. However, Dogold later discovers Endolf's personality was influencing his and attempts to take Dantetsu Kiryu as his new host to maintain his sense of self, only to be betrayed by the Debo Yanasanta brothers and lose his hold over Endolf. With his rage quota filled and having lost his standing with Chaos, who knew of his transgression from the beginning, Dogold is forcibly equipped with two Deboth Cell-based rings and forced to become Endolf's bodyguard, apparently losing his sense of honor. During the Deboth Army's final battle however, Dogold regains his freedom and joins forces with Utsusemimaru to destroy Endolf. Having sustained heavy damage during the fight, Dogold forces the Kyoryuger to give him a warrior's death.

In battle, Dogold can generate lightning and wields the  Seven-Branched Sword. With Utsusemimaru as his host, Dogold can wield the Pteragordon Zyudenchi and control Pteragordon in both its Zyudenryu mode and as PteraidenOh.

Aigallon
 is a spade/Tin Man/Wind-up toy-themed crybaby Deboth Knight with a sharp tactical mind charged with amassing sadness for Deboth. After being revived a year prior to the series, Aigallon donned a cloak of invincibility and traveled to Europe to steal an amber gemstone to add to his collection of jewels, murdering Shiro Mifune in order to do so and developing a rivalry with a vengeful Ian Yorkland. After losing the gemstone, Deboth's apparent death, and Debo Hyogakki seeking vengeance for it using his Freeze-cry Tactic, a rage-filled Aigallon seeks to kill the Kyoryugers with a suicide attack in retaliation for not being able to cry, but the Kyoryugers survive while his armored body prevents his soul from entering Deboth Hell. Chaos secretly revives Aigallon, which causes the knight to suffer from inexplicable personality shifts and take on a psychotic side. During this time, he develops a crush on fellow knight Canderrilla and defects from the Deboth Army once he learns Chaos plans to kill her. While protecting her and Luckyulo from his replacement, Icelond, Aigallon learns the truth of his revival and confesses his feelings for her before taking a fatal blow meant for Canderrilla. Seeing what happened, a conflicted Yorkland forgoes his revenge and puts Aigallon out of his misery by destroying his armor, allowing his soul to find peace.

Endolf
 is the joker/winged monkey/candle-themed embodiment of Deboth's hatred created by Chaos after seeing that resentment is the ideal emotion to battle the Kyoryugers' Brave. Endolf is tasked with accelerating Deboth's evolution by aiding the other Deboth Knights and targeting the Kyoryugers themselves, endearing himself to Aigallon and Canderrilla while making enemies out of Dogold and a distrustful Luckyulo. Endolf seemingly meets his end after being mortally wounded by Kyoryu Red Samba Carnival and becoming Dogold's host, but by Christmas, he amasses enough hatred to manipulate Dogold and arrange his freedom with the aid of the Debo Yanasanta brothers. While Canderrilla and Aigallon stop Endolf from exacting revenge, Endolf uses his new position as Chaos' second-in-command to turn Dogold into his personal slave in an attempt to break him. However, Endolf is caught off-guard when Dogold joins forces with Kyoryu Gold to destroy him.

Icelond
, is a faucet/conductor-themed Deboth Knight created by Chaos to serve as Aigallon's replacement in amassing sadness for Deboth's revival, eventually becoming one of Chaos's personal enforcers. He is sent to kill Canderrilla for betraying the Deboth Army, but Aigallon sacrifices himself to protect her before Kyoryu Black uses Aigallon's Tohohawk to destroy Icelond.

Killborero
, is a brass instrument-themed Deboth Knight created by Chaos to serve as Canderrilla's replacement in amassing joy for Deboth's revival, eventually becoming one of Chaos's personal enforcers. Amidst Deboth's endgame, Killborero enlarges and battles the Zyudenryu before Plezuon seemingly destroys him. While he resurfaces in the Kyoryugers' Spirit Base to destroy it, he is destroyed by Kyoryu Black, Blue, and Green.

In battle, Killborero wields the  trumpet, with which he can utilize sound-based attacks either by himself or with Icelond.

Zorima
Due to their Deboth cells, groups of Zorima can clump together and merge into the dinosaur-like  to combat the Zyudenryu. The  are armored variants who served under Debo Tangosekku during the Sengoku period armed with a sword or a bident.

Beautiful Zoreamer can also use his brush on the Kyoryugers to boost his Zorima supporters' powers by stealing the former's colors. After being defeated by Kyoryu Red Samba Carnival, Beautiful Zoreamer is enlarged by Luckyulo before he and his entourage of Giant Zorima and Cambrima are destroyed by Gigant BragiOh and PteraidenOh Dricera.

Cambrima
Despite being 100 times stronger than the Zorima, they have a month-long lifespan as most are subjected to being Dogold's hosts.

Minor members
First appearing in the film Zyuden Sentai Kyoryuger: Gaburincho of Music, Chaos created D during the Mesozoic to combat the Zyudenryu and harvest the dinosaurs' emotional energy. To complete the latter task, D took control of Tobaspino and used it to exterminate the dinosaurs before a priestess' singing freed the Zyudenryu, who crushed D. In the present, Chaos resurrects D and grants him the Deathryuger Zyudenchi so he can become the navy blue Kyoryuger-like . D kidnaps the priestess' descendant, Mikoto Amano, and attempts to renew his efforts to use Tobaspino to destroy the world. When the Kyoryugers foil his plans, D enlarges himself to destroy the world before he is hindered by Mikoto's singing and killed by SpinoDaiOh.
Gadoma was created by Deboth as a last line of defense during his original battle with the Zyudenryu before Bragigas mortally wounded the monster with the Gigant Cannon. While fragments of its body were laced in the Zyudenchi, Gadoma's core remained intact, as Chaos has it fished out of Lake Madō before the lake dries out while the Kyoryugers revive Bragigas in the present. After creating a new body from the surrounding ground, Gadoma overwhelms the Kyoryugers by using its fragments to invoke a curse on them before they eventually manage to break it. Gadoma is destroyed by Gigant Kyoryuzin, but it uses the last of its power to connect Earth to Deboth Hell.
: An Archaeopteryx-themed evil doppelgänger of Torin, whom he considers a "lousy brother", who is armed with the  sword, with which he can perform the  attack. He is created by Chaos to guard the portal to Deboth Hell, but Mad Torin is defeated in battle by Kyoryu Silver and killed by Gigant Kyoryuzin, which seals the portal. Mad Torin later returns from Deboth Hell during Deboth's endgame to warn him of Torin's actions before dying from his injuries. Mad Torin is voiced by Toshiyuki Morikawa, who also voices Torin.

Debo Monsters
The  are alien monsters created by Deboth and one of the Deboth Knights' energies. With the exception of the Zetsumates, the majority that followed them are based on modern day objects and correspond to the knight who created them. When the lake is dried up, several of them are brought back and ingest items to regain their physical forms before the lake is restored. After the Kyoryugers seal the path to Deboth Hell and destroy several of the revived Debo Monsters however, Deboth loses the ability to create new Debo Monsters. Amidst Deboth's endgame, the Debo Monsters were to be revived once more, but Torin, the Spirit Rangers, and Canderrilla destroy Deboth Hell and ensure the Debo Monsters' permanent demise.

: A car crusher-themed Debo Monster created to serve Aigallon by using his  to flatten buildings. He is defeated by the Kyoryugers, enlarged by Luckyulo, and destroyed by Kyoryuzin.
: A prison-themed Debo Monster created to serve Dogold by using his  to entrap martial artists and athletes in inescapable cages to enrage them. He is defeated by Kyoryu Red and Green, enlarged by Luckyulo, and destroyed by Kyoryuzin Stegotchi Zakutor.
: A raven/bank vault-themed Debo Monster created to serve Aigallon by using his chest-mounted  for hammerspace purposes,  shurikens, and Aigallon's invincibility cloak to deprive humans of their favorite things. He is defeated by the Kyoryugers, enlarged by Luckyulo, and destroyed by Kyoryuzin Western.
Debo Bathisie is eventually defeated by the Kyoryugers, enlarged by Luckyulo, and destroyed by Kyoryuzin.
He is created to serve Dogold by using his  to disguise Zorima, grant them the ability to tap into a person's subconscious, and infuriate people by telling them their worst trait. Debo Yakigonte is defeated by the Kyoryugers, enlarged by Luckyulo, and destroyed by Kyoryuzin Macho.
: A maze-themed Debo Monster armed with the  flag. He is created to serve Aigallon by forcing people to see illusions of deceased family members. However, Debo Kokodoko is defeated by Kyoryu Blue, enlarged by Luckyulo, and destroyed by Kyoryuzin Western.
: A bone-themed Debo Monster created to serve Canderrilla by using his  ability to remove male humans' thoracic vertebrae to make them her ardent admirers. He is defeated by Kyoryu Pink and Gold after they exploit Debo Honenukki's inability to use his powers on women, enlarged by Luckyulo, and destroyed by Kyoryuzin and PteraidenOh.
He was originally created to serve Dogold during the Sengoku period before returning in the present to kidnap young boys and make them violent. He is defeated by the Kyoryugers, enlarged by Luckyulo, and destroyed by Raiden Kyoryuzin. In the DVD special It's Here! Armed On Midsummer Festival!!, he and Debo Tanabanta are revived as the ghostly  and possess Nobuharu Udo before they are destroyed by Kyoryu Red and Gold.
Debo Jakireen is defeated by Kyoryu Green and Gold, enlarged by Luckyulo, and destroyed by PteraidenOh Western.
: A strict classroom-themed Debo Monster armed with the  pointer, the left arm-mounted  gun, and knowledge on the Kyoryugers' arsenal. He is created by Chaos to train Luckyulo into a more effective Deboth Army member, but the Debo Monster kidnaps Amy Yuuzuki instead and is destroyed by Kyoryu Gold.
: A treasure-themed Debo Monster armed with the  pickaxe, and the ability to perform the  attack. He is created to serve Canderrilla by making humans find treasures. He is defeated by the Kyoryugers, enlarged by Luckyulo, and destroyed by Raiden Kyoryuzin.
In this form, she is armed with  baby rattle, which allows her to perform the  attack. As one of Aigallon's prized minions, she is tasked with forcing doting parents to abandon their spoiled children in a two-pronged scheme to siphon joy from the former and sorrow from the latter. However, the Kyoryugers defeat her before she is enlarged by Luckyulo and destroyed by PteraidenOh Bunpachy.
He is created to serve Canderrilla by granting people's Tanabata wishes and siphon their joy until they die the day after. He is defeated by the Kyoryugers and Dantetsu Kiryu, enlarged by Luckyulo, and destroyed by Kyoryuzin Kung-Fu. In the DVD special It's Here! Armed On Midsummer Festival!!, he and Debo Tangosekku are revived as the ghostly Festival Brothers and possess Nobuharu Udo before they are destroyed by Kyoryu Red and Gold.
: A counting sheep/sleep-themed Debo Monster armed with the  pillow, the  pillow, and the  pillow. He is created by Luckyulo to use his dream invasion ability to give the Kyoryugers nightmares in retaliation for the Deboth Army's apparent destruction, but they are able to defeat the Debo Monster. Debo Akkumuun is subsequently enlarged by Luckyulo and destroyed by PteraidenOh, PlezuOh, and Kyoryuzin Stegotchi Zakutor. Following his return from Deboth Hell, Debo Akkumuun becomes a student under Debo Kibishidesu and Spokorn and joins them in a scheme to switch the Kyoryugers' minds using his newly acquired  pillow before he is defeated by the Kyoryugers, enlarged by Luckyulo, and destroyed by Gigant Kyoryuzin.
He is created to serve Endolf by killing Daigo Kiryu to make the other Kyoryugers resentful. He is defeated by Kyoryu Red Carnival, enlarged by Luckyulo, and destroyed by Bakuretsu Kyoryuzin.
: A blue-ringed octopus/cheetah/hunter-themed Debo Monster armed with the  machete, the  crossbow, and the  motorcycle. He is created to serve Endolf by killing Daigo Kiryu to make the other Kyoryugers resentful, only to be destroyed by Kyoryu Black, Blue, Green, and Pink.
: A hybrid Debo Monster armed with Debo Zaihon's Kokohore Wonder and Debo Doronboss' Bick Bank. He is accidentally created by Luckyulo to steal a Lost Stone, though the latter was attempting to recreate Debo Doronboss and Aigallon believed he meant Debo Zaihon. Debo Zaihodoron is defeated by Kyoryu Red Macho Carnival, enlarged by Luckyulo, and destroyed by Bakuretsu Kyoryuzin. Debo Zaihodoron is voiced by Hajime Iijima.
He was created by Canderrilla during the summer, but she forgot about him until autumn began. Despite his apparent uselessness, Dogold offers to help by having Debo Vacance enlarged, enter Earth's orbit, and use his  to turn humans into lazy "Holi-Humans" as well as enrage unaffected individuals so they can siphon their joy and anger respectively all while a clone takes the Debo Monster's place to distract the Kyoryugers. After Kyoryu Red destroys the clone, Debo Vacance shrinks down and attempts to flee, only to be destroyed by Kyoryu Red Kung-Fu Carnival.
He is created by Dogold to train the Zorima into a more effective fighting force, distract the Kyoryugers from the Deboth Army's attempt to steal a Lost Stone, and help Aigallon fill his sadness quota. The Debo Monster and his team are defeated by the Kyoryugers, enlarged by Luckyulo, and destroyed by Bakuretsu Kyoryuzin, PteraidenOh Western, and PlezuOh Ankydon. Following his return from Deboth Hell, Debo Spokorn becomes the Deboth Academy Private School's coach to help Debo Kibishidesu educate Debo Akkumuun and exact revenge on the Kyoryugers. However, they are defeated by the Kyoryugers, enlarged by Luckyulo, and destroyed by Gigant Kyoryuzin.
He is created by Chaos to retrieve Gadoma's core from Lake Madō. Once he fulfills his mission, Debo Tairyon fights and is defeated by the Kyoryugers and Spirit Rangers, enlarged by Luckyulo, and destroyed by Gigant BragiOh.
: A movie camera/film director-themed Debo Monster armed with the clapperboard-like  axe and the ability to create film genre-themed scenarios. He is created by Canderrilla to help her stage romantic scenes and trap men that fall for her. He is defeated by Kyoryu Blue with Canderrilla's indirect help, enlarged by Luckyulo, and destroyed by Gigant Kyoryuzin.
They are seemingly created to serve Dogold by distributing gifts containing Deboth's  to siphon the disappointed children's anger and merge into giant . The first and second Debo Yanasanta merge into a form with 12 times their individual strength, but are defeated by Kyoryu Red and Gold while the Kyoryugers destroy the Clone Deboth. The remaining brothers return to Japan to capture Dantetsu Kiryu on Dogold's orders and merge into a form with 345 times their individual strength. However, they betray Dogold for their true master, Endolf, who enlarges them before they are destroyed by Gigant Kyoryuzin, PteraidenOh Ankydon, and PlezuOh Bunpachy.

Zetsumates
The , are a trio of ancient Debo Monsters infamous for causing the Cretaceous–Paleogene extinction event that killed the dinosaurs. Working together, they can perform the  attack. Though each is destroyed individually in the present, the Zetsumates are resurrected by Chaos to stop Plezuon's return and get revenge on the Kyoryugers, though they are all destroyed once more.

As the first Debo Monster and Zetsumate to awaken in the present, he is destroyed by Kyoryu Red and Gabutyra. After being revived alongside his fellow Zetsumates, they attack Plezuon Lab, but are repelled. Following Deboth's apparent death, Debo Hyogakki attempts to exact revenge with his  to freeze people alive via their tears, only to be defeated by the Kyoryugers, enlarged by Luckyulo, and destroyed by Bakuretsu Kyoryuzin.
Revived during the Middle Ages, Debo Viruson was seemingly destroyed by Kyoryu Cyan and Ankydon. In reality, a piece of him ended up in Ankydon's Zyudenchi and regenerated, allowing the Debo Monster to infect the Zyudenryu over the centuries and project his image outside of it. Though he inadvertently sabotages Canderrilla's scheme with Debo Bathisie, Debo Viruson offers his aid to her by using his  to make humans fall into a permanent slumber filled with sweet dreams. After Amy Yuuzuki tricks him into leaving Ankydon, he is destroyed by Kyoryuzin Macho. After being revived alongside his fellow Zetsumates, Debo Viruson creates the computer virus-themed  to destroy Plezuon Lab while he infects a dam with Restoration Water using his  to revive Deboth. However, Debo Viruson is enlarged and absorbed by the reawakened Deboth, which causes Debo Computer Viruson to die as well.
 : A meteoroid/Chicxulub impactor-themed Debo Monster and the last Zetsumate to face the Kyoryugers. Revived in sixth century China, Debo Nagareboshi battled Kyoryu Gray before being sealed within a volcano. By the present, the former is awakened by Deboth's increasing power. After learning of his fellow Zetsumates' demises, Debo Nagareboshi vows to avenge them, only to be destroyed by Kyoryuzin Kung-Fu. He is later revived alongside his fellow Zetsumates, but is destroyed by PlezuOh.

Other Debo Monsters
 : A quartet of seasonal-themed Debo Monsters who were created to serve Arslevan in 2114, only to be killed by the 2114 Kyoryugers, and appear exclusively in the V-Cinema special Zyuden Sentai Kyoryuger Returns: Hundred Years After.
 : A spring-themed Debo Monster who resembles Debo Tangosekku and is armed with the shamisen-like . Debo Harudamonne is voiced by Noriaki Sugiyama.
 : A summer-themed Debo Monster who resembles Debo Vacance. Debo Natsudamonne is voiced by Yasuhiro Takato.
 Debo Akidamonne: An autumn-themed Debo Monster identical to Aigallon's version. Debo Akidamonne is voiced by Takehiro Murozono.
 : A winter-themed Debo Monster who resembles Debo Yanasanta. Debo Fuyudamonne is voiced by Chō.
He is created to serve Canderrilla, but is defeated by the Kyoryugers, enlarged by Luckyulo, and killed by Raiden Kyoryuzin.

Canderrilla
Initially a member of the Deboth Army, Canderrilla is tasked with amassing joy so Deboth can better understand human emotions after they resurfaced. She wholeheartedly supports the Deboth Army until she creates the Debo Monster, Debo Kantokku, and indirectly helps Nobuharu Udo defeat her creation. As she starts to have second thoughts and leaves the Deboth Army to find the dismissed Luckyulo, Canderrilla is eventually deemed a threat and replaced by Killborero as Deboth's Joyful Knight. After Aigallon sacrifices himself to protect her, she and a repentant Luckyulo temporarily go into hiding before helping Torin and the Spirit Rangers destroy Deboth Hell. Soon after, Canderrilla is motivated by Nobuharu to help humans.

During the events of the crossover film Ressha Sentai ToQger vs. Kyoryuger: The Movie and the Korean sequel series Zyuden Sentai Kyoryuger Brave, Canderrilla helps reunite the Kyoryugers so they can join forces with the ToQgers to defeat Devius and support the Kyoryuger Brave in the wake of the Neo-Deboth Army's attack respectively.

However, due to Arslevan's influence and her desire to be helpful like Torin, she temporarily forgets the original team's colors before Udo's descendant helps her remember.

Luckyulo
 is Canderrilla's childish rag doll/diamonds/Scarecrow-themed subordinate and bodyguard and former member of the Deboth Army. While he aids all three of Deboth's knights, Chaos regards him as a lazy eyesore as Luckyulo spends more time reading manga instead of contributing to Deboth's revival and makes several failed attempts to correct his behavior. When the Deboth Army is apparently destroyed, Luckyulo attempts to defeat the Kyoryugers himself by creating Debo Akkumuun to attack them in their dreams. Though this scheme fails, Luckyulo gains Chaos' praise and inspires Endolf's creation. Following the creation of Deboth Super-Growth Cells however, Chaos deems Luckyulo expendable and orders him to be killed. After Aigallon sacrifices himself to save Luckyulo, the latter and a distraught Canderrilla go into hiding before resurfacing to help her get into Deboth Hell with his  so they can help Torin and the Spirit Rangers. Soon after, Luckyulo decides to assist Canderrilla in helping humans.

When the Deboth Army returns in 2114 during the events of the V-Cinema special Zyuden Sentai Kyoryuger Returns: Hundred Years After, a mature  helps Canderrilla revive the Kyoryugers to combat them.

During his time with the Deboth Army, Luckyulo is charged with enlarging the Debo Monsters using , a fluid that intensifies anything made of Deboth cells, kept in the pumpkin-themed  watering can. He can also use his  wallet to store various things. Chaos later gives Luckyulo  to absorb Restoration Water and shrink enlarged Debo Monsters if necessary.

Torin
 is the anthropomorphic Archaeopteryx-like mentor of the Kyoryugers. However, Torin came to love the planet's beauty and resolved to protect its lifeforms instead. Though he was unable to save the dinosaurs and forced to watch his partner Bragigas sacrifice himself to damage their enemy's heart, Torin managed to freeze Deboth's body and wound his older brother, Chaos. Following the fight, he used Bragigas' remains to create the Spirit Base under the "Golden Land", which would go on to become Japan, and dedicated himself to keeping Deboth from fully resurrecting by creating the Kyoryugers over the intervening millennia.

While helping them, Torin successfully hides his heritage from the Kyoryugers until Chaos works with Endolf to seek revenge by exposing Torin's true nature. Torin attempts to commit suicide to ensure Deboth could not be resurrected, but his allies revive him to prove that they maintain their faith in him. After reuniting with Bragigas, Torin initially believes he is not worthy to be his partner. Following Deboth's resurrection, Torin works with Dantetsu Kiryu to arrange the former's death so he can destroy Deboth Hell and ensure Deboth's permanent demise.

Torin's spirit returns during the events of the Korean sequel series Zyuden Sentai Kyoryuger Brave and the V-Cinema special Zyuden Sentai Kyoryuger Returns: Hundred Years After to recruit the Kyoryuger Brave and help Dai-kun become the new Kyoryu Red respectively.

On his own, Torin can teleport, sense Deboth cell-based beings like himself, fire energy orbs, and wields the  sword in battle. However, he is unable to remain outside of the Spirit Base's healing aura for extended periods of time due to his past injuries, which cause him to slowly petrify. As Kyoryu Silver, he is able to use the Feather Edge to perform the  finisher.

Dantetsu Kiryu
 is Daigo's father who took him on worldly travels. When Daigo was an infant, Dantetsu was bathed in the Light of the Earth and gained the ability to hear the planet's melody. After being found by Torin, who refers to him as mankind's King, Dantetsu proved instrumental in the development of the modern Kyoryugers' arsenal. A decade prior to the series, Dantetsu sensed the Deboth Army gathering strength and left his amber pendant with Daigo before embarking on a quest to find the Lost Stones. By the present day, he returns to give Torin the Lost Stones he had found by then and save Daigo from Dogold. Upon locating the Earth's original melody, Dantetsu and Torin arrange the latter's death so he can destroy Deboth hell while the former takes on the mantle of Kyoryu Silver to help the Kyoryugers defeat Deboth himself.

Due to being empowered by the Light of the Earth, Dantetsu possesses the Earth's Rage, which allows him to utilize powerful qi punches strong enough to damage Debo Monsters and incapacitate Deboth's generals. As Kyoryu Silver, he can perform the  attack.

Ramirez
By the present, he became a ghostly  due to his bond with his Zyudenryu and provides assistance to the modern day Kyoryugers when he can before eventually passing on his powers to Nobuharu's sister, Yuko Fukui.

Tessai
 is a focused yet hard-headed martial artist from sixth century China who regards himself as the embodiment of yin and yang. Once he tests the modern day Kyoryugers' worthiness and helps them become stronger, Tessai assists them in their fight against the Deboth Army before eventually passing on his powers to his descendant, Shinya Tsukouchi.

Doctor Ulshade
 is a genius scientist who has a habit of getting carried away and giving himself back problems. After the primary Kyoryugers are assembled, Ulshade left on a six-month expedition into space to learn more about Deboth. Once he fulfills this mission, he returns to Earth to entrust Plezuon to the Kyoryugers prior to being temporarily hospitalized while fighting the Deboth Army. Due to this, he is forced to retire and pass on the mantle of Kyoryu Violet to his granddaughter, Yayoi.

Yayoi Ulshade
 is Doctor Ulshade's granddaughter and assistant. After he is temporarily hospitalized following his return to Earth, she takes over her grandfather's task of upgrading Plezuon and inherits the mantle of Kyoryu Violet from him despite initial fears that she could not live up to it. After becoming Kyoryu Violet, she provides technical and combat assistance to the Kyoryugers whenever she is not training with her grandfather.

Neo-Deboth Army
The  is the successor to the present day Deboth Army following the latter's destruction at the hands of the original Kyoryugers. 100 million years prior, the Zyudenryu banished the Neo-Deboth Army to space. Aside from reusing the Zorima as their foot-soldiers, the executive members are named after Earth elements.

Deizarus
 is the fossil-themed leader of the Neo-Deboth Army. Apart from seeking the Power of the 'Saur King to become a destroyer of worlds, Deizarus bears a personal vendetta against the Zyudenryu, who drove him from Earth in a humiliating manner. He initially assumes Juhyeok is his quarry until he learns Kwon Juyong is the true 'Saur King and abducts him to siphon his power for himself. After Juhyeok foils the absorption process and saves Juyong, Deizarus enlarges and converts his spaceship into exo-armor in an attempt to capture the brothers before he is destroyed by Brave Raiden Kyoryuzin.

Raimein
Similar to Dogold, he is armed with a seven-branched sword and holds Juhyeok in contempt. Raimein is destroyed by Brave Kyoryu Gold.

Homuras
Similar to Endolf, he is armed with a sword whose hilt can be used as a makeshift pistol. Homuras is the first member of the Neo-Deboth Army to launch an attack on Earth and fights Brave Kyoryu Red, Black and Blue before retreating. During Deizarus' endgame, Homuras battles the Kyoryuger Brave before willingly becoming a sacrificial distraction while fighting Brave Gigant Kyoryuzin.

Wahab
Similar to Aigallon, he is armed with a battle axe. Wahab is destroyed by Juhyeok when the former learns the latter's secret and attempts to tell Deizarus.

Tsuraira
Tsuraira enlarges before he is destroyed by Brave Raiden Kyoryuzin.

Arash
Similar to Killborero, Arash is armed with a trumpet-like gun. He enlarges before he is destroyed by Brave Gigant Kyoryuzin.

Jinarik
He attacks and brainwashes Gigabragigas until Torin eventually frees the latter. Jinarik enlarges before he is destroyed by Brave Gigant BragiOh.

Bojinma
The  are a quartet of Four Symbols-themed giant robots utilized by the Neo-Deboth Army to fight the Kyoryuger Brave's Zyudenryu.

: The first model to be deployed that utilizes hand-to-hand combat in battle. It assists Homuras in his rampage on Earth before it is destroyed by Brave Kyoryuzin.
: The second model to be deployed that possesses a left arm-mounted Gatling gun. Arash deploys it to cover his escape from the Kyoryuger Brave following his defeat before it is destroyed by Brave Kyoryuzin Western.
: The third model to be deployed that possesses a right arm-mounted lance. Wahab deploys it after he and Tsuraira fail to intercept the Kyoryuger Brave before it is destroyed by Brave Kyoryuzin.
: The fourth and last model to be deployed after Brave Kyoryu Gold betrays Homuras and Raimein. This model is armed with Sei and Suza Bojinma's Gatling gun and lance respectively. It is destroyed by Brave Raiden Kyoryuzin.

Guest characters
After she was injured during an attack by the Deboth Army prior to the series, despite Kyoryu Blue's best efforts to protect her and her mother, Rika sees Kyoryu Blue as a hero as opposed to her mother. Rika later learns of her uncle's heroic identity and takes pride in being Kyoryu Blue's niece, though she keeps Udo's identity a secret from her mother.
: Nobuharu Udo's sister who possesses similar strength as her brother. A single mother to her daughter, Rika, she was widowed when her husband, died four years prior to the series. Yuko initially believes both the Kyoryugers and the Deboth Army are dangerous after Rika was injured during one of the latter group's attacks and she witnessed Kyoryu Blue apparently attacking her. Over time, her opinion on the Kyoryugers and Kyoryu Blue soften. After she deduces Udo is Kyoryu Blue, she accepts it and keeps it secret from him until she becomes the new Kyoryu Cyan.
: A title given to the Yuuzuki family's butlers. The current Gentle works to accommodate all of Amy Yuuzuki's needs while she lives in Japan, exhorting her to always behave like an elegant and graceful young lady despite her headstrong personality. While Gentle is initially taken aback by Yuuzuki single-handedly defeating a group of Zorima and learning she is a Kyoryuger, he agrees to keep it a secret from her parents.
: Souji's strict father and the current head of the Rippukan House who wants his son to follow in his footsteps. Due to this strictness, Genryu was divorced by his wife Reiko while Souji stayed by his side after seeing him break down into tears. Though he originally fears Souji was deviating from their Musouken style to an unorthodox feral fighting style, Genryu learns his son incorporated aspects of their kenjutsu and praised him for his ingenious technique, inspiring him to create and apply new ways for their kenjutsu's future.
: A treasure hunter and Ian Yorkland's best friend. While on an expedition in Europe to find a mysterious stone prior to the series, Mifune was ambushed and killed by Aigallon for the stone following the Deboth Army's reawakening. As Aigallon was wearing his invincibility cloak at the time of the incident and Debo Doronboss wore it when he confronts the Kyoryugers, Yorkland initially believes the latter was Mifune's murderer before eventually discovering the truth and stealing the stone back.
Lord : Utsusemimaru's master who fought the Deboth Army alongside him during the Sengoku Period. Lord Iwaizumi Mōshinosuke is portrayed by Ryo Ryusei, who also portrays Daigo Kiryu.
: The kendo club manager at Souji's high school who harbors an unrequited crush on him. As of the V-Cinema special Zyuden Sentai Kyoryuger Returns: 100 Years After, Katsuyama married Souji, died, and is survived through her descendant, Soujirou.
: A popular idol known as "Meeko", an acquaintance of Daigo Kiryu's, and the descendant of an ancient priestess who sang to free the powerful Zyudenryu Tobaspino from the Deboth Army's control. First appearing in the film Zyuden Sentai Kyoryuger: Gaburincho of Music, Deboth Army member D kidnaps her because she had inherited her ancestor's ability and forces her to help him regain control of Tobaspino. However, Mikoto is able to resist and help the Kyoryugers purify Tobaspino before entrusting them with the Zyudenryu's Zyudenchi. In episode 39 of the series, Mikoto returns to Japan after another tour to seemingly meet with Daigo, but she has fallen under D's control, who intends to use her to create an undead army and exact his revenge.
: A kindly young manga author and Tessai's descendant who writes Amy Yuuzuki's favorite manga series under the female alias  to help people feel good about themselves. He comes into contact with the Kyoryugers after requesting Yuuzuki's help in posing as his pen name to give a terminally ill fan his autograph, which Tessai resents, believing his descendant is being dishonest. After seeing Tsukouchi save a woman from the Deboth Army using his fighting style and learning the author's reasoning for writing mangas however, Tessai sees him in a new light and later appoints Tsukouchi as the new Kyoryu Gray. Shinya Tsukouchi is portrayed by Masayuki Deai, who also portrays Tessai.
: A wealthy fashion designer and Souji's mother. She and Genryu separated while Souji was still a child, though Souji stayed with his father. In the present, she returns to take her son under her wing and travel the world against his will until Torin intervenes and Souji drives off an attack by the Deboth Army, both of which convince Reiko to accept her son's choices and make peace with Genryu.

Spin-off exclusive characters
: Two human-like warriors named  and  who serve D until they are killed by Kyoryu Black and Pink and appear exclusively in the film Zyuden Sentai Kyoryuger: Gaburincho of Music.
: An evil entity similar to Deboth who was created from the combined hatred of the Abarangers and Zyurangers' enemies, the Dezumozorlya and Great Satan respectively, to destroy all dinosaur-themed Super Sentai groups during the events of the crossover film Zyuden Sentai Kyoryuger vs. Go-Busters: The Great Dinosaur Battle! Farewell Our Eternal Friends. To assist him in his endeavors, he creates Neo-Geilton and Neo-Grifforzar, revives and joins forces with Vaglass, and corrupts AbaRed and Tyranno Ranger to harness the power of Dark  to complete his evolution. Voldos also corrupts the Kyoryugers and sends them back in time to destroy their Zyudenryu partners' past selves, but they, AbaRed, and Tyranno Ranger eventually break free and join forces with the other Abarangers and Zyurangers as well as the Go-Busters to defeat the space dinosaur's forces and Voldos himself.
After being defeated by the Abarangers, Neo-Geilton uses Vaglass' data to transform into , only to be destroyed by the ToQgers before he could use his new power. Neo-Geilton is also voiced by Takuma Terashima.
After being defeated by the Zyurangers, he absorbs energy from the dinosaur Sentai teams' combined attacks and uses it to complete Voldos's evolution, sacrificing himself in the process.
: A moth/Wicked Witch of the West-themed alien armed with the  who created Deboth ages prior and appears exclusively in the crossover film Ressha Sentai ToQger vs. Kyoryuger: The Movie. After siphoning a Galaxy Line station's energy to assume a physical form, he attacks the Kyoryugers and ToQgers, but is defeated by ToQ 1gou. Devius enlarges, only to be destroyed by the ToQgers, Kyoryugers, and the Shadow Line's leaders.
He arranges an alliance with the Shadow Line on Devius' behalf before using the former for their energy and absorbing several of their monsters to transform into . Despite this, he is destroyed by ToQ Rainbow and Gigant Kyoryuzin.
2114 Kyoryugers: The original Kyoryugers' descendants who Canderrilla and Luckyulo recruit in the year 2114 to combat the revived Deboth Army and appear exclusively in the V-Cinema special Zyuden Sentai Kyoryuger Returns: 100 Years After. Due to Arslevan's temporal abilities, the pair accidentally give most of the new Kyoryugers the wrong Zyudenchi, though they eventually realize the mistake and assume their ancestral predecessors' original roles. Once assigned to their proper Zyudenchi, the 2114 Kyoryugers are able to assume Zyuden Arms versions of their forms the instant they transform.
: Daigo Kiryu and Amy Yuuzuki's great-grandson who initially lacked self-confidence and became  with the Tobaspino Zyudenchi. After meeting Minityra and Torin's spirit, Dai-kun eventually finds his Brave and becomes the new Kyoryu Red. Dai-kun is portrayed by Ryo Ryusei, who also portrays Daigo Kiryu.
: Ian Yorkland's descendant and a womanizing musician who initially becomes the new Kyoryu Silver before becoming Kyoryu Black. Icchan is portrayed by Syuusuke Saito, who also portrays Ian Yorkland.
: Nobuharu Udo's descendant and Rika Fukui's grandson from the Tōhoku region's countryside who becomes the new Kyoryu Blue. Nobuta-san is portrayed by Yamato Kinjo, who also portrays Nobuharu Udo.
: Souji and Rin Katsuyama's impatient great-grandson who initially becomes the new Kyoryu Gray before becoming Kyoryu Green and inheriting the Feather Edge. Soujirou is portrayed by Akihisa Shiono, who also portrays Souji Rippukan.
: Daigo and Yuuzuki's straightforward and gutsy great-granddaughter and Dai-kun's older sister who initially becomes the new Kyoryu Cyan before becoming Kyoryu Pink. Ami is portrayed by Ayuri Konno, who also portrays Amy Yuuzuki.
: Real name , he is Utsusemimaru's descendant who became a flashy pro-bowler following the bowling boom of 2114. He initially becomes the new Kyoryu Violet before becoming Kyoryu Gold. Uppie is portrayed by Atsushi Maruyama, who also portrays Utsusemimaru.
2114 Deboth Army: A faction of the original Deboth Army who Arslevan created and absorbed as part of his revenge plan, though they outlive their creator and become the enemies of the 2114 Kyoryugers.
: The flippant and ignorant figurehead leader who resembles Chaos and was manipulated by Arslevan into believing he was him. Gaos is voiced by Takayuki Sugō, who also voices Chaos.
Sneld is voiced by Satoshi Tsuruoka, who also voices Dogold.
: A monster who resembles Aigallon, but is prone to incessantly expressing envy towards everyone. Hoshiigallon is voiced by Yū Mizushima, who also voices Aigallon.
: A Deboth Knight born from Deboth's regret amidst his final destruction who is armed with the  sword and appears exclusively in the V-Cinema special Zyuden Sentai Kyoryuger Returns: 100 Years After. Arslevan hid himself away between dimensions for 100 years to rebuild the Deboth Army and used his temporal abilities to tamper with the world's memories of the Kyoryugers. Emerging in 2114, he manipulates his creation Gaos into believing the latter was the reincarnated Chaos and pretends to serve under him while the former amasses humans' negative emotional energy. Once he absorbs his followers to finish doing so, Arslevan travels back in time to prevent Deboth's defeat, only to be blasted back to 2114 by the present day Kyoryugers and killed by their descendants.

Notes

References

Bibliography
 
 

Zyuden Sentai Kyoryuger